The Department of Migrant Workers (abbreviated as DMW) is the executive department of the Philippine government responsible for the protection of the rights and promote the welfare of Overseas Filipino Workers (OFW) and their families. The department was created under the Department of Migrant Workers Act (Republic Act No. 11641) that was signed by President Rodrigo Duterte on December 30, 2021. The functions and mandate of the Philippine Overseas Employment Administration (POEA) will serve as the backbone of the department and absorbing the seven offices of the Department of Labor and Employment (DOLE) and Department of Foreign Affairs (DFA) namely the Office of the Undersecretary for Migrant Workers' Affairs (OUMWA) of the DFA, Philippine Overseas Labor Office (POLO), International Labor Affairs Bureau (ILAB), National Reintegration Center for OFWs (NRCO) and the National Maritime Polytechnic (NMP) of the DOLE. The Overseas Workers Welfare Administration (from DOLE) will serve as its attached agency and the DMW Secretary will serve as the concurrent Chairperson of OWWA.

The department is also mandated to closely coordinate with the Bangsamoro Ministry of Labor and Employment (MOLE) on the training, protection and regulation of deployment of overseas Bangsamoro workers.

History

On July 12, 2019, during the Araw ng Pasasalamat for OFWs (Thanksgiving day for the Overseas Filipino Workers), President Duterte in a speech promised to finish the framework for the creation of a department that caters to the need of OFWs.

On July 23, 2019, Taguig-Pateros Representative and Speaker Alan Peter Cayetano together with Representative Lani Cayetano of Taguig and Representative Paolo Duterte of Davao City filed House Bill No. 00002 and was referred to the Congressional Committee on Government Reorganization and Committee on Overseas Workers Affairs. On March 11, 2020, the House of Representatives with 173 yeas and 11 nays, approved House Bill No. 5832 or the creation of Department of Filipinos Overseas and Foreign Employment.
 
During his last State of the Nation Address on July 26, 2021, President Duterte marked House Bill No. 5832 as urgent and urged the Senate to pass the bill. Senator Joel Villanueva filed Senate Bill No. 1848 or the Department of Overseas Filipinos Act. Subsequent bills were filed in the Senate and were consolidated under Senate Bill No. 2234. Senate Minority Leader Franklin Drilon introduced several institutional amendments that delimit the scope of the new department to overseas migrant workers and the welfare of Filipinos overseas will be handled by the Department of Foreign Affairs. On December 14, 2021, the Senate unanimously (20-0-0) approved Senate Bill No. 2234
The following day, the House chose to adopt SB No. 2234 over its House Bill No. 5832 understanding the urgent certification of the President.

During the commemoration of the 125th death anniversary of Dr. Jose Rizal at the Malacañang Palace on December 30, 2021, President Duterte signed Republic Act No. 11641 and was witnessed by Senate President Vicente Sotto III, Speaker Lord Allan Velasco and DOLE Secretary Silvestre Bello III.

Secretaries

Note:
 * - Abdullah Mama-o served only as the ad interim secretary of the Department of Migrant Workers from March 9 to June 30, as the department has just been established under the Duterte administration.

Sub-departments and agencies
 Overseas Workers Welfare Administration
 Undersecretary for Internal Management and Administration (from POEA)
 Undersecretary for Foreign Employment and Welfare Services (from POEA, OUMWA, NRCO)
 Undersecretary for Licensing and Adjudication (from POEA)
 Undersecretary for Policy and International Cooperation (from ILAB)
 Philippine Overseas Labor Offices (POLO) 
 Migrant Workers Resource Center (MWRC)
 National Maritime Polytechnic (NMP)
 Maritime Industry Tripartite Council (MITC)
 Overseas Land-based Tripartite Consultative Council (OLTCC)
 Office of the Social Welfare Attaché (OSWA)
 Overseas Filipino Bank (OFBank), in association with Department of Finance
 Overseas Filipino Hospital (OFH), in association with Department of Health

References 

Migrant Workers
Labour ministries
Overseas Filipino Worker
Migrant workers
2021 establishments in the Philippines
Government agencies established in 2021